Licence to Kill is a 1989 James Bond film.

Licence to Kill or License to Kill may also refer to:

Film and television
 License to Kill (1964 film) or Nick Carter va tout casser, a French action film
 License to Kill (1984 film), an American television film
 License to Kill (2013 film), a German documentary film about Israel
 "License to Kill", an episode of Dick Powell's Zane Grey Theatre
 "License to Kill", a two-part episode of The Fall Guy
 "License to Kill", an episode of the television series Laramie
 License to Kill, a 2019 medical TV series hosted by Terry Dubrow

Music 
 Licence to Kill (soundtrack), a soundtrack album from the James Bond film, 1989
 "Licence to Kill" (song), the movie theme song, performed by Gladys Knight
 License to Kill, an album, or its title song, by Malice, 1987
 "License to Kill", a song by Bob Dylan from Infidels, 1983

Other uses
 Licence to kill (concept), a literary device used in espionage fiction
 007: Licence to Kill, a 1989 video game based on the James Bond film
 Venom: License to Kill, a 1997 comic book miniseries

See also
 Licensed to Kill (disambiguation)